The Lake Mathews Formation is a geologic formation in Riverside County, California.

It is located in the Lake Mathews reservoir area, in the Temescal Mountains.

The sedimentary formation preserves fossils dating back to the Neogene period.

See also

 
 List of fossiliferous stratigraphic units in California
 Paleontology in California

References
 

Geology of Riverside County, California
Neogene California
Temescal Mountains